The Fântâna Albă massacre took place on 1 April 1941 in Northern Bukovina when up to 3,000 civilians were killed when their attempt to forcefully cross the border from the Soviet Union to Romania, near the village of Fântâna Albă, now in Chernivtsi Oblast, Ukraine, was met with open fire by the Soviet Border Troops. Although according to Soviet official reports no more than 44 civilians were killed, local witnesses assert a much higher toll, stating that survivors were tortured, killed, or buried in mass graves. Other survivors were allegedly taken away to be tortured and killed at the hands of the NKVD, the Soviet secret police. Some sources refer to this massacre as "the Romanian Katyn".

In 2011, the Chamber of Deputies of Romania adopted a law establishing 1 April as the National Day honoring the memory of Romanian victims of massacres at Fântâna Albă and other areas, of deportations, of hunger, and other forms of repression organized by the Soviet regime in Hertsa (now Ukraine), northern Bukovina, and Bessarabia.

Background
 
In late June 1940, Romania was forced to withdraw from a territory inhabited by 3.76 million people, submitting to an ultimatum by the Soviet Union; see Soviet occupation of Bessarabia and Northern Bukovina. The Romanian administration and military were evacuated, while the Red Army and the NKVD quickly occupied the land. Many families were caught by surprise by the rapid sequence of events, and had members on both sides of the new border. Therefore, many tried to cross the border, with or without official permission. According to official Soviet data, in the area patrolled by the 97th Unit of the Soviet Border Troops, 471 people had crossed the border illegally from the districts of Hlyboka, Hertsa, Putila, and Storozhynets.

From the more remote areas of Chernivtsi Oblast (the northern portion of the acquired territories that were included in the USSR), such as the districts of Vashkivtsi, Zastavna, Novoselytsia, Sadhora, and Chernivtsi-rural, 628 people crossed the border to find refuge in Romania. This phenomenon cut across all ethnic and social groups in the occupied territories. A Ukrainian scholar estimated the number of refugees to Romania during the first year of Soviet administration at 7,000.

The Soviet authorities' reaction to this phenomenon was twofold. First, border patrol efforts were strengthened. Second, lists were made of families that had one or more members which had fled to Romania, and thus were considered "traitors of the Motherland", therefore subject to labor camp deportation. On 1 January 1941, the lists made by the 97th Unit of the Soviet Border Guards mentioned 1,085 persons. Tables for other localities included names for 1,294 people (on 7 December 1940). At this point, even people who were merely suspected of intending to flee to Romania began to be included.

On 19 November 1940, 40 families (a total of 105 people) from the village of Suceveni, also carrying 20 guns, tried to cross the frontier at Fântâna Albă. At night, a battle ensued with the Soviet border guards, during which 3 people were killed, 2 were wounded and captured by the Soviets, while the rest of the group (including 5 wounded) managed to arrive in Rădăuți, on the other side of the border. However, in short order, the relatives of those 105 people were all arrested and deported to Siberia.

In January 1941, over 100 villagers from Mahala, Ostrița, Horecea and other villages successfully crossed the border and arrived in Romania. This gave confidence to other villagers. Consequently, a group of over 500 people from the villages of Mahala, Cotul Ostriței, Buda, Șirăuți, Horecea-Urbana, and Ostrița tried to cross to Romania during the night of 6 February 1941. However, they had been denounced to the authorities and were discovered by the border guards at 06:00. Volleys of machine gun fire from multiple directions resulted in numerous dead, including the organizers N. Merticar, N. Nica, and N. Isac. About 57 people managed to reach Romania, but 44 others were arrested and tried as "members of a counter-revolutionary organization". On 14 April 1941, the Kiev Military District Tribunal sentenced 12 of them to death, while the other 32 were sentenced to 10 years forced labor and 5 years of loss of civic rights each. As had been the case before, all the family members of these "traitors to the Motherland" were also arrested and deported to Siberia.

The massacre
On 1 April 1941, approximately 2,000 to 2,500 or 3,000 unarmed people from several villages (Pătrăuții de Sus, Pătrăuții de Jos, Cupca, Corcești, and Suceveni), carrying a white flag and religious symbols, walked together towards the new Soviet-Romanian border. There were rumors circulating that the Soviets would now permit crossing to Romania; research by Ukrainian historians indicate such rumours had been spread by the Romanian intelligence services, which had sent agents across the Soviet border. The Soviet border guards attempted to turn back the group several times, issuing a final verbal warning and firing shots in the air when the people arrived at Varnystia, near the border. After the convoy pressed on, the border guards began to shoot, reportedly after some members of the group fired. According to the Soviet official report, casualty figures amounted to 44 people (17 from Pătrăuții de Jos, 12 from Trestiana, 5 each from Cupca and Suceveni, 3 from Pătrăuții de Sus, 2 from Oprișeni), although the numbers were reportedly higher according to survivor testimonies. A partial listing of those victims which were later identified:
From Carapciu: Nicolae Corduban, Cosma Opaiț, Gheorghe Opaiț, Vasile Opaiț, Cosma Tovarnițchi, Gheorghe Tovarnițchi, Vasile Tovarnițchi.
From Cupca: Ioan Belmega, Ioan Gaza, Arcadie Plevan, Mihai Țugui.
From Dimca (Trestiana): Petre Cimbru, Vasile Cimbru, Nicolae Drevariuc, Petre Jianu.
From Suceveni: Dragoș Bostan, Titiana Lupăștean, Gheorghe Sidoreac, Constantin Sucevean.
From Iordănești: Gheorghe A. Carp, Mihai Corduban, Dumitru Halac, Ion Halac, Nicolae Halac, Dumitru Opaiț, Constantin Molnar.
From Pătrăuții de Jos: Zaharia Boiciu, Ana Feodoran, Gheorghe Feodoran, Nicolae Feodoran, Teodor Feodoran, Maftei Gavriliuc, Ion Pătrăuceanu, Ștefan Pavel, Rahila Pojoga.
From Pătrăuții de Sus: Constantin Cuciureanu, Gheorghe Moțoc, Arcadie Ursulean.
Other people shot and killed that day: Ion Cobliuc, Petru Costaș, Ion Hudima, Petru Palahniuc.

The exact death toll remains a matter of controversy. Moldovan political scientist Aurelian Lavric estimates that, from the initial group of 2,000 people who came to Fântâna Albă that day, some 200 were killed directly by gunfire, and many more wounded, with an additional 24 killed and 43 wounded from a separate group of 100 persons from Carapciu, Iordănești, and Prisăcăreni. Ukrainian historian Serhiy Hakman on the other hand estimates around 50 killed and many wounded. Some of the wounded were allegedly caught afterwards, tied to horses and dragged to previously excavated common graves, where they were killed with shovels or buried alive. Other wounded were brought to the Hlyboka NKVD headquarters, where they were tortured and many died. Some of the latter were taken after being tortured to the city's Jewish cemetery, and thrown alive into a common grave, over which quicklime was poured. 

An account of the events is given by one of the few surviving eyewitnesses, Gheorghe Mihailiuc (born in 1925, now a retired high-school teacher), in his book, Dincolo de cuvintele rostite ("Beyond spoken words"), published in 2004 by Vivacitas, in Hlyboka. Mihailiuc describes what happened at Fântâna Albă on 1 April 1941, as a "massacre", a "genocide", and a "slaughter". Professor Ion Varta from Chișinău is of the opinion that "the Romanians from Bucovina were lured into a trap, in order to give an exemplary lesson to all those who wanted to cross the border into Romania. Horror and fear had to enter their bones, so that in the future they would no longer nurture such a desire."

Aftermath and larger context

During 1940–1941, between 11,000 and 13,000 Bukovinians (mostly, but not only ethnic Romanians) were deported to Siberia and the Gulag, 1,421 of them dying in the camps. As a result of immigration, deportations and killings, the Romanian population of the Chernivtsi region dropped by more than 75,000 between the Romanian 1930 census and the first Soviet census of 1959. It has been claimed that these persecutions were part of a program of deliberate extermination, planned and executed by the Soviet regime.

According to Ukrainian political scientist Marin Gherman, Soviet narratives about the Fântâna Albă massacre had two main objectives — to obscure the details of the slaughter and to present it as an action of the Romanian and German intelligence services — so as to absolve the Soviet authorities of responsibility. Gherman points out that these narratives continue to this day: in March 2021, the Facebook page of the Chernivtsi Regional State Administration published a video about the massacre, stating that only 50 people were killed, omitting the fact that these were Romanian ethnics, and labelling the action "a planned and deliberate act of defiance by the Romanian secret service against the inhabitants of Bukovina." In rebuttal, MEP Eugen Tomac stated that those who produced the video claiming that only 50 citizens were killed at Fântâna Albă were inspired by Stalin's theses, and denounced this fact as unacceptable.

On 1 April 2016, the 75th anniversary of the massacre, a ceremony was held in Fântâna Albă, with the participation of the Governor of Chernivtsi Oblast, the abbot of Putna Monastery, and several Romanian officials, including Dan Stoenescu and Viorel Badea. In an interview, Stoenescu stated that "this tragedy of the Romanian people was followed by other retaliations as the one in 1941 when other thousands of Romanians of Bukovina, many of them being the relatives of the victims of Fântâna Albă massacre, were taken away from their houses and deported to Siberia and Kazakhstan."

See also
Lunca massacre
List of massacres in the Soviet Union
Katyn massacre
Tatarka common graves

Notes

References and sources 

  Vasile Ilica, "Martiri și mărturii din nordul Bucovinei (Fântâna Albă-Suceveni-Lunca-Crasna-Ijești...)", Oradea, 2003
  Vasile Mănescu, "Masacrul de la Fîntîna Albă", Monitorul de Neamț, 4 April 2006

External links

Mass murder in 1941
1941 in Romania
1941 in Ukraine
Massacres in 1941
Romania–Soviet Union relations
Massacres in the Soviet Union
Massacres in Ukraine
Massacres in Romania
NKVD
History of Bukovina
History of Chernivtsi Oblast
Romania in World War II
1941 in the Moldavian Soviet Socialist Republic
Anti-communism in Moldova
Soviet occupation of Bessarabia and Northern Bukovina
Soviet World War II crimes
April 1941 events
Massacres of Romanians